The 59th Infantry Division "Cagliari" was a infantry division of the Royal Italian Army during World War II. The Cagliari was classified as a mountain infantry division, which meant that the division's artillery was moved by pack mules instead of the horse-drawn carriages of line infantry divisions. Italy's real mountain warfare divisions were the six alpine divisions manned by Alpini mountain troops.

The division was formed on 5 April 1939 in Vercelli and named for the city of Cagliari. Garrisoned in Vercelli, the division was made up almost entirely of men from northern Piedmont, especially from the cities of Vercelli and Ivrea. The division participated in the Greco-Italian War in 1940-41 and was then sent to the Peloponnese in Greece as garrison unit. There the division was disbanded by invading German forces after the Armistice of Cassibile between Italy and the Allies was announced on 8 September 1943.

History 
The division's lineage begins with the Brigade "Cagliari" established in Turin on 1 August 1862 with the 63rd and 64th infantry regiments.

World War I 
The brigade fought on the Italian front in World War I. On 30 September 1926 the brigade command and 64th Infantry Regiment "Cagliari" were disbanded, while the 63rd Infantry Regiment "Cagliari" was assigned to the XXVI Infantry Brigade. On 5 April 1939 the 64th Infantry Regiment "Cagliari" was reactivated in Ivrea and the 59th Artillery Regiment "Cagliari" was raised in Casale Monferrato. On the same date the 59th Infantry Division "Cagliari" was activated in Vercelli and was assigned its two namesake infantry regiments and the 59th Artillery Regiment "Cagliari".

World War II

Invasion of France 
In June 1940 the Cagliari was assigned to I Army Corps and participated in the Italian invasion of France. On 10 June 1940 the division was stationed on the French-Italian border on the Mont Cenis-Monte Niblè-Rocciamelone line. On 15 June the division crossed the border and captured Dents d'Ambin, Sommet de la Nunda, Pas de la Beccia and Col de Sollières around Mont Cenis lake by 17 June 1940. On 21 June 1940 the Cagliari reached the Arc river valley and started advancing to Bramans and Le Planey (on Ruisseau d'Étache stream), capturing both on 23 June 1940. Immediately an attack was initiated towards the Val d'Ambin with the aim to take Modane, but the Franco-Italian Armistice signed 24 June 1940 ended hostilities the next day. The division remained in the Arc valley until the end of September, when it returned home to Italy.

Greco-Italian War 
On 21 January 1941 the division was ordered to move to Albania to reinforce the Italian front in the ongoing Greco-Italian War. On 31 January 1941 the Cagliari division arrived in Berat and was assigned to VIII Army Corps. First contact with Greek forces was made on 8 February 1941 near Berat, with clashes at Mali i Tërpanit and Paraspuar following soon. On 12 February 1941 the Italian front had stabilised from Qafa e Bubësit to positions in valleys of Osum and Tomorrica rivers. On 11 March 1941, as part of the Italian Spring Offensive, the Cagliari attacked towards Bubës, capturing it on 13 March 1941. The division's assaults of Monastery Hill a few kilometers south on 14–19 March 1941 were unsuccessful.

As a result of Greek units disengaging after the start of the German invasion of Greece on 6 April 1941, the Cagliari advanced to the ridge overlooking the Këlcyrë Gorge on 15 April 1941, overcoming some Greek rearguard resistance. On 18 April 1941 the division continued the pursuit to Përmet and reached the pre-war border stream of Perati on 20 April 1941, where Greek rearguards once more tried to make a stand. After the Greek surrender the Cagliari was used as occupation force in Kalpaki. In June 1941, the division was transferred to the southern Peloponnese, where garrisons were established in Tripoli, Kalamata and Sparta. The division undertook anti-partisan duties and coastal defence duties until September 1943. After the announcement of the Armistice of Cassibile on 8 September 1943 the Cagliari was disbanded by the German 117. Jäger-Division.

Organization 
  59th Infantry Division "Cagliari", in Vercelli
 63rd Infantry Regiment "Cagliari", in Vercelli
 Command Company
 3x Fusilier battalions
 Support Weapons Company (65/17 infantry support guns)
 Mortar Company (81mm Mod. 35 mortars)
 64th Infantry Regiment "Cagliari", in Ivrea
 Command Company
 3x Fusilier battalions
 Support Weapons Company (65/17 infantry support guns)
 Mortar Company (81mm Mod. 35 mortars)
 363rd Infantry Regiment "Cagliari" (raised on 1 November 1941 by the depot of the 63rd Infantry Regiment "Cagliari")
 Command Company
 3x Fusilier battalions
 Support Weapons Company (47/32 anti-tank guns)
 Mortar Company (81mm Mod. 35 mortar; disbanded in October 1942)
 59th Artillery Regiment "Cagliari", in Casale Monferrato
 Command Unit
 I Group (100/17 howitzers)
 II Group (75/27 field guns)
 III Group (75/27 field guns)
 57th Anti-aircraft battery (20/65 Mod. 35 anti-aircraft guns)
 Ammunition and Supply Unit
 LIX Mortar Battalion (81mm Mod. 35 mortars)
 59th Anti-tank Company (47/32 anti-tank guns)
 15th Engineer Company
 59th Telegraph and Radio Operators Company
 29th Medical Section
 59th Supply Section
 59th Truck Section
 349th Transport Section
 Bakers Section
 6th Carabinieri Section
 234th Carabinieri Section
 29th Field Post Office

Attached to the division from 1941 to early 1942:
 28th CC.NN. Legion "Randaccio"
 XI CC.NN. Battalion
 XXVIII CC.NN. Battalion (remained attached to the division until September 1943)
 28th CC.NN. Machine Gun Company

Attached to the division in 1943:
 II Carabinieri Battalion
 III Guardia di Finanza Battalion
 VIII Squadrons Group "Lancieri di Firenze"
 VIII Artillery Group
 XLVII Artillery Group 
 XCIII Artillery Group
 CXIII Artillery Group
 CLXXXVII Artillery Group
 CLXXXVIII Artillery Group

Commanding officers 
The division's commanding officers were:

 Generale di Divisione Ruggero Tracchia (5 April 1939 - 24 May 1940)
 Generale di Brigata Antonio Scuero (25 May 1940 - 15 November 1940)
 Generale di Brigata Giuseppe Gianni (16 November 1940 - 12 March 1941)
 Generale di Divisione Paolo Angioy (13 March 1941 - September 1943)

References 

 

Infantry divisions of Italy in World War II
Italian military units and formations of the Greco-Italian War
Military units and formations of Italy in Greece in World War II
Military units and formations established in 1939
Military units and formations disestablished in 1943
Peloponnese in World War II